Enrique "Quique" Ortiz (born 16 July 1979 in Córdoba) is an Argentine footballer who used to play for F.C. Lyn Oslo, in the Norwegian Premier League.

Career
Ortiz spent most of his career at his local club Instituto de Córdoba, before signing for Lyn in the summer of 2005, halfway through the Norwegian season. He made his debut against Molde F.K. on 7 August 2005, and was a regular for the rest of the season.

References

External links
 Profile at lyn.no
 Profile at lynfotball.net

1979 births
Living people
Footballers from Córdoba, Argentina
Argentine footballers
Argentine expatriate footballers
Instituto footballers
Lyn Fotball players
Eliteserien players
Expatriate footballers in Norway
Association football defenders